The discography of John Frusciante, who is best known as the guitarist of the rock band Red Hot Chili Peppers, consists of eleven solo albums, two internet only release albums, seven EPs, as well as two albums with collaborators Joe Lally and Josh Klinghoffer under the name Ataxia and two EPs and three studio albums under the alias of Trickfinger. After recording Mother's Milk and Blood Sugar Sex Magik, Frusciante left the Red Hot Chili Peppers in 1992 when he got tired of the growing success of the band. He released his first solo album, Niandra LaDes and Usually Just a T-Shirt, in 1994 on American Recordings. His second record, Smile From the Streets You Hold, was released in 1997 and later taken off the market at his request in 1999. After returning to the Red Hot Chili Peppers in 1998, Frusciante recorded Californication with the band and subsequently released his third solo album, To Record Only Water for Ten Days, in February 2001 on Warner Music Group.

Red Hot Chili Peppers released By the Way in 2002, with Frusciante taking a central role in the songwriting. Following the album's tour, Frusciante released Shadows Collide with People in 2004; it became his first solo album to influence a music chart and is his only solo album to date featuring Chad Smith. In 2004, Frusciante switched from Warner Brothers to the Record Collection label and released a series of six records in six months. Four of six included collaboration with multi-instrumentalist Josh Klinghoffer and the period produced collaborations with Fugazi members Joe Lally and Jerry Busher, and producer Ian MacKaye, as well as Carla Azar and Omar Rodriguez-Lopez

Frusciante began working with Omar Rodríguez-López in 2001 and has since collaborated on many recordings under both artists' names. Frusciante also was considered an honorary member of The Mars Volta from 2002 to 2008, occasionally performing live with the band from 2003 to 2006. Frusciante served as executive producer on Rodríguez-López's first film, released in 2010, The Sentimental Engine Slayer, which was filmed in 2007.

In 2006, the Red Hot Chili Peppers released their Grammy Award-winning double album Stadium Arcadium. Frusciante began work on his tenth solo record, The Empyrean, shortly thereafter and subsequently released the album in early 2009. In December 2009, Frusciante revealed that he had left Red Hot Chili Peppers more than a year earlier, during their hiatus.  Since then, he has gone on to release 2012's Letur-Lefr EP and Sect In Sgt EP (the latter recorded under the alias of Trickfinger), the full-length follow-up PBX Funicular Intaglio Zone, its experimental sequel, 2014's Enclosure, his 2015 album, Trickfinger and more recently Trickfinger II. Frusciante has also gone on to collaborate as Speed Dealer Moms with Venetian Snares, and with Swahili Blonde and Kimono Kult with his now former wife, Nicole Turley, as well as with the Black Knights.  He has also released a number of solo tracks on his bandcamp and soundcloud pages. In December 2019, Frusciante again re-joined the Red Hot Chili Peppers, and their twelfth album Unlimited Love was ultimately released on April 1, 2022 and was followed soon after by their thirteenth album, Return of the Dream Canteen on October 14, 2022. Frusciante continues to release solo albums under his own name and under the Trickfinger name with three new releases in 2020.

Solo material

Studio albums

Internet albums

EPs

Singles

Trickfinger

With Josh Klinghoffer

Ataxia

With Red Hot Chili Peppers

Studio albums

Live, compilation and other albums

With The Mars Volta

Studio albums

With Omar Rodríguez-López

With Speed Dealer Moms

With Swahili Blonde

With Kimono Kult

With Black Knights

Other contributions and guest appearances

DVDs and videos

Solo music videos

Additionally, the entirety of John Frusciante's album To Record Only Water for Ten Days was made into a series of short experimental films directed by Vincent Gallo in 2001. This film was never given any official release, though the videos were shown on MTV2.

Red Hot Chili Peppers

DVDs

Music videos

References

General
 

Specific

External links
 Official website
 Official discography
 
 

Rock music discographies
Discographies of American artists